Cristian Jiménez may refer to:
 Cristian Jiménez (footballer, born 1995)
 Cristian Jiménez (footballer, born 2002)